This is a list of seasons completed in the National Football League (NFL) by the Jacksonville Jaguars, an American football franchise based in Jacksonville, Florida. The Jaguars, along with the Carolina Panthers, joined the NFL as 1995 expansion teams. Jacksonville is one of four teams to have never played in a Super Bowl, along with the Cleveland Browns, Detroit Lions and Houston Texans. The Jaguars have played in the AFC Championship Game in the 1996, 1999, and 2017 seasons.

Season records

All-time records

Footnotes

References 
 
 
 
 
 
 
 

Seasons
Jacksonville Jaguars
 
Events in Jacksonville, Florida